Marie Collonvillé (born 23 November 1973 in Amiens) is a French heptathlete.

She was the first-ever IAAF-recognised world record holder in the women's decathlon; the event was officially recognised from 1 January 2005, and her mark of 8160 set in Talence on 26 September 2004 was broken by Austra Skujytė on 15 April 2005.

She was a regular competitor at the annual Hypo-Meeting.

International competitions

Personal bests
100 metres –  12.54 (2006)
200 metres –  24.71 (1997)
800 metres –  2:10.90 (1999)
100 metres hurdles –  13.52  (2000)
High jump –  1.94 (1997)
Long jump –  6.44 (2006)
Shot put –  12.73 (2006)
Javelin throw –  49.14 (2004)
Heptathlon –  6350 (1997)
Decathlon –  8150 (2004)

See also
 High Jump Differentials - Women

References

External links

1973 births
Living people
Sportspeople from Amiens
French heptathletes
French decathletes
French female athletes
Olympic athletes of France
Athletes (track and field) at the 2004 Summer Olympics
Athletes (track and field) at the 2008 Summer Olympics
World Athletics Championships athletes for France
World record setters in athletics (track and field)
Female decathletes
Universiade medalists in athletics (track and field)
Mediterranean Games gold medalists for France
Mediterranean Games bronze medalists for France
Mediterranean Games medalists in athletics
Athletes (track and field) at the 1997 Mediterranean Games
Athletes (track and field) at the 2005 Mediterranean Games
Universiade bronze medalists for France
Medalists at the 1997 Summer Universiade